Alin Cristinel Pânzaru (born 18 January 1976) is a Romanian former professional footballer who played as a midfielder. Pânzaru made his Liga I debut on 4 December 1993, for Oțelul Galați in a 1-1 draw against Inter Sibiu. In his first 9 years of career Pânzaru played mainly for teams from Galați such as: Oțelul Galați, Dunărea Galați or Constant CFR Galați. In 2003 he signed a contract with FC Vaslui, then playing for FC Gloria Buzău and the Moldovan side Zimbru Chișinău. In 2007 he moved to Oțelul Galați and Dunărea Galați bitter rival, Dacia Unirea Brăila, named CF Brăila at that time, and played there in more than 100 matches, until his retirement in 2012.

In 2012, after retirement, Pânzaru started immediately his football manager career at his last club as a player Dacia Unirea Brăila.

Trivia
During the 2017–18 Liga II season he was the protagonist of a controversial moment, when he accused Gabriel Iosofache and Costel Roșu, two of the club players, of match fixing. Dacia Unirea was already in the middle of some media speculations at that moment due to some results with frequent score changes, such as: 2-3 (ASU Politehnica Timișoara), 4-4 (Știința Miroslava), 4-3 (Luceafărul Oradea), 2-3 (Olimpia Satu Mare), 3-4 (UTA Arad) or 3-3 (Pandurii Târgu Jiu). The rumors were also relied on the poor financial situation of the team, with some outstanding salaries of almost a year, the big scandal born at Luceafărul Oradea after the match against Brăila, when the owner of the club retired, the coach suspected his players of being involved in the betting mafia and finally the club being close to implosion and also Dacia Unirea's matches started to disappear from the betting offer.

Honours

Player
FC Vaslui
Divizia B: 2004–05

CF Brăila
 Liga III: 2009–10

References

External links
 
 
 

1976 births
Living people
Sportspeople from Iași
Romanian footballers
Association football midfielders
Liga I players
ASC Oțelul Galați players
Liga II players
FCM Dunărea Galați players
FC Vaslui players
FC Gloria Buzău players
AFC Dacia Unirea Brăila players
Moldovan Super Liga players
FC Zimbru Chișinău players
Romanian expatriate footballers
Romanian expatriate sportspeople in Moldova
Expatriate footballers in Moldova
Romanian football managers
AFC Dacia Unirea Brăila managers
ASC Oțelul Galați managers